Sarangani Bay is a bay located on the southern tip of Mindanao in the Philippines. It opens up to the Celebes Sea on the Pacific Ocean. General Santos, one of the Philippines most important cities and ports, is located at the head of the bay, making the bay one of the busiest and often the site of shipping accidents. The province of Sarangani, created in 1992, is named after the bay.

Gallery

References

Bays of the Philippines
Protected seascapes of the Philippines
Landforms of Sarangani
Landforms of South Cotabato